Pelagius of Córdoba (c. 912–926) (in Spanish San Pelayo Mártir) was a Christian boy who died as a martyr in Córdoba in southern Spain around 926 AD.

Narrative
There are three accounts of Pelagius. The earliest, The Martyrdom/Passion of St Pelagius was written by one Raguel, a priest of Córdoba. The second is an account retold in verse by Hrotsvitha of Gandersheim; and the third is a Mozarabic liturgy from about 967 when his body was recovered and brought to Toledo (his relics were later deposited in Oviedo Cathedral).

Pelagius was left by his uncle at the age of ten as a hostage with the Caliph Abd-ar-Rahman III of al-Andalus, in trade for a clerical relative previously captured by the Moors, the bishop Hermoygius. The exchange never occurred, and Pelagius remained a captive for three years. According to the testimony of other prisoners, his courage and faith was such that the Caliph was impressed with him when he had attained the age of 13. The Caliph offered him his freedom if Pelagius converted to Islam. The boy, having remained a pious Christian, refused the Caliph's offer.

The original story recounts how the beauty of the boy subjected him to the homosexual desire of the caliph. The emphasis on his beauty by early Christian choirs suggests an awareness on the part of the Christians themselves of the dangers of such attractions, and has prompted modern observers to remark, "That liturgy... focuses as intently on Pelagius' beauty as did the caliph."

His beauty was such that the Caliph fell in love with him when he had attained the age of 13. The boy, having remained a pious Christian, refused the Caliph's advances, striking the monarch and insulting him. Enraged, Abd-ar-Rahman had the boy tortured for six hours and then dismembered. Other accounts have him being shot from a catapult over the city walls, with the Caliph expecting his body to be dashed on the rocks of the river. When Pelagius emerged from this harsh sentence unharmed, he was then decapitated. The various accounts uphold his refusal to fulfil the Caliph's wishes.

Pelagius was later enshrined as a Christian martyr and canonized as "Saint Pelagius." His observation is celebrated on 26 June. The cult of Saint Pelagius is thought to have provided spiritual energy for centuries to the Reconquista (the Christian reconquest of Spain), and is seen by some modern scholars as part of a pattern of portraying Islamic morality as inferior to other moral codes.

Interpretation
Jeffrey A. Bowman says that The Martyrdom of St. Pelagius not only demonstrates a conventual attack on Muslim morals, but also depicts a hero who refuses to assimilate. At a time when the Christian minority was attempting to maintain its identity and traditions, its members were increasingly enticed by the more dominant culture. Cordoba was a rich, sophisticated city with many fine houses, libraries, and bath houses. "As Raguel wrote, Christians in Al-Andalus were converting to Islam in increasing numbers. Christian leaders complained that young Christians were more interested in learning Arabic than Latin."

Lisa Weston finds a similar theme in Hrotsvitha's poem. "Produced within and serving the needs of a cultic community, [the] hagiographic narrative enacts this negotiation of licit and illicit desires, and the subsequent formation of boundaries between "us" (the saint's community) and "them" (the persecutors and other non-believers) upon the textual body of the saint." The poet deplores the dissolution of the one into the other. Pelagius spurns Abd-ar-Rahman's touch saying, "It is not right that a man cleansed by the baptism of Christ should submit his chaste neck to a barbaric embrace, nor should a worshipper of Christ, anointed with the sacred chrism, accept the kiss of such a lewd slave of demons". The Caliph's persistent advances being rejected by Pelagius constituted blasphemy for which he was executed.

The enraged king declares war against Christian Galicia. The saint's resistance is thus both religious and political. As a soldier of Christ, death is preferable to offending the Creator of the Universe and suffering an eternity in hell. As a Miles Christi (soldier of Christ), "death was preferable to yielding to foreign and barbaric customs."

See also
Tribute of 100 virgins
Martyrs of Córdoba

External links
Catholic Online profile of Pelagius
History of Pelagius of Cordova

Bibliography: historical background
Jessica Coope: Martyrs of Cordoba: Community and Family Conflict in an Age of Mass Conversion: Lincoln: University of Nebraska Press: 1995: .
Kenneth Wolf: Christian Martyrs in Muslim Spain: Cambridge: Cambridge University Press: 1988: .
Mark D. Jordan, The Invention of Sodomy in Christian Theology, Chicago, 1997; pp. 10–28

Notes

910s births
926 deaths
Year of birth uncertain
Spanish saints
10th-century people from al-Andalus
10th-century Christian saints
Christian child saints
Christian saints killed by Muslims
People from Córdoba, Spain
Medieval LGBT history
Christians from al-Andalus